"Fingertips" is a 1963 hit single recorded live by "Little" Stevie Wonder for Motown's then Tamla label.

Overview
Written and composed by Wonder's mentors, Clarence Paul and Henry Cosby, "Fingertips" was originally a jazz instrumental recorded for Wonder's first studio album, The Jazz Soul of Little Stevie. The live version of the song was recorded in 1963 during a Motortown Revue performance at the Regal Theater in Chicago, Illinois. Containing only a few stanzas of improvised lyrics, "Fingertips" is essentially an instrumental piece, meant to showcase Wonder's talents on the bongos and the harmonica.

"Part 2"
The edit point that begins "Part 2" of "Fingertips" is when Wonder shouts "Everybody say 'yeah!'", initiating a call-and-response exchange with the audience. After a couple of sung verses, each followed by Wonder's brief harmonica playing (solos accompanied only by the audience's rhythmic clapping), Wonder appears to bring things to a conclusion. On the night of the recording, Wonder, as usual started to leave the stage and the band went into the exit music, as musician and emcee Bill Murray (known professionally as Winehead Willie) exhorted the crowd to "give him a hand"; however, Stevie unexpectedly changed his mind, returning to sing the "goodbye" encore. The other musicians were caught out, and the bass players had changed over to prepare for the next act on the bill, Mary Wells. As Wonder moves into his impromptu encore, the new bass player, Joe Swift, having replaced Larry Moses, can be heard on the recording, yelling out: "What key? What key?"

Release
The live version of "Fingertips" was released on May 21, 1963 as a two-part single, with Part 2 (with the encore) as the B-side. The 707 mono features "Sunset" and "Contract on Love". By August, the single B-side had reached the top of both the Billboard Pop Singles and R&B Singles charts. "Fingertips" was Motown's second number-one pop hit (following The Marvelettes' "Please Mr. Postman"), and launched the then 13-year-old Wonder to prominence. The single's success helped Wonder's live album, Recorded Live: The 12 Year Old Genius, reach number-one on the Billboard Pop Albums chart, making him the youngest artist to accomplish that feat. Because of Part 2's success, it would later feature on various compilation albums just as the full recording.

Both the studio and live versions of the song featured drumming by Marvin Gaye, who had been playing drums for Wonder and other Motown artists and would become a big Motown star in his own right.

Personnel
Vocals, bongos, and harmonica by Little Stevie Wonder
Drums by Marvin Gaye
Bass by James Jamerson, Larry Moses, Joe Swift
Horn Arrangement by Johnny Allen
Recording engineer, Ron Steele Sr.

In popular culture
The song is used in trailers for Jordan Peele’s movie Nope.

References

External links

1963 singles
Stevie Wonder songs
Billboard Hot 100 number-one singles
Cashbox number-one singles
Live singles
Songs written by Henry Cosby
Songs written by Clarence Paul
Tamla Records singles
1963 songs
Song recordings produced by Berry Gordy